Bailu is a town under the administration of Lushan City, Jiujiang, China. , it has one residential community, 9 villages and one forest area under its administration.

References 

Township-level divisions of Jiangxi
Lushan City